Nick Dixon is a Scottish journalist, television presenter and former television producer, best known for his roles on ITV Breakfast programmes GMTV, Daybreak and Good Morning Britain. In 2005, Dixon joined breakfast programme GMTV as a news correspondent and a stand-in news presenter on the programme. When GMTV closed in 2010, he was transferred to the show's successor Daybreak where he worked as their New York City correspondent. He is now based in London working as a News Correspondent for the current ITV Breakfast show Good Morning Britain.

Career
Nick Dixon left school at the age of 16 and went to work for BBC Scotland delivering the mail.

In 1991, Dixon started as a copy boy in the newsroom of BBC Radio Scotland, moving onto typing up stories from reporters and correspondents and helping out on location.

Dixon joined Radio Clyde in Glasgow as a Production Assistant in 1993 and in the same year worked as a researcher on the BBC quiz show Catchword.

Dixon started with Scottish Television (STV) as a Promotions Director in 1995.

1999 marked the beginning of Dixon's time with Scottish Television's flagship news programme Scotland Today, starting as a production journalist. Dixon reported on news items such as the Maryhill gas explosion, the Tsunami appeal, the opening of the Scottish Parliament and the Edinburgh Festival.

Dixon has also produced and presented a documentary on STV entitled Archie McLean: The Forgotten Father of Brazilian Football.

Moving to London in July 2005, Dixon joined GMTV as a news producer. He was promoted to reporter in November 2005 and during his first week on the job reported live from the Paris riots on the Champs-Élysées. Dixon reported live from Times Square, New York City on David Blaine's world record attempt in May 2006. He was also a relief newsreader on GMTV.

In September 2010, Dixon transferred to ITV Breakfast programme Daybreak as New York correspondent. From July 2011 until April 2014, he was a Features correspondent, based in London. In April 2014, Daybreak was axed to make way for a new ITV Breakfast programme called Good Morning Britain for which Dixon is a news correspondent.

Filmography

References

External links

1971 births
British male journalists
GMTV presenters and reporters
ITV Breakfast presenters and reporters
Living people
Scottish journalists
STV News newsreaders and journalists